Dmitry Tursunov was the defending champion but decided not to participate.
Mikhail Kukushkin won the title, defeating Illya Marchenko 6–3, 6–3 in the final.

Seeds

Draw

Finals

Top half

Bottom half

References
 Main Draw
 Qualifying Draw

American Express - TED Open - Singles
2013 Singles
2013 in Turkish tennis